Alexander Borisovich Dybman (born in 1962) is an inactive Soviet International draughts player, two-time World champion (in 1986 and 1987), and four-time Soviet champion in International draughts.

At the age of 17, in 1979, Dybman won a bronze medal at the Soviet championship, and in 1980 he shared a second place at the Soviet championship with the former World champion, Vyacheslav Shchyogolev. In 1980 and 1981, Dybman won silver medals at the World junior championships–first in a tournament (with Alexander Baljakin taking the first place), and then after losing in the final barrage to another young Soviet player, Vadim Virny.

The best period in Dybman's playing career started in 1983, where he won four Soviet championships in a row. (In 1985, he took part in the Fall championships and skipped the ones in the Spring). The following year he won the World championship in Groningen and was awarded a Grandmaster title. The next year, he played a World championship match against Anatoli Gantvarg, drawing all 20 games which meant that he retained the World crown for one more year.

In the late 1980s, Alexander Dybman fell seriously ill. The Soviet medicine was not able to help him, and he moved to Germany. Since then, he almost never plays in rating-related tournaments.

References

External links 
 Profile at the Tournament base of the Dutch Draughts Federation

Soviet draughts players
Russian draughts players
Players of international draughts
1962 births
Living people